The Taiping Rebellion, also known as the Taiping Civil War or the Taiping Revolution, was a conflict waged in China between the Manchu-led Qing dynasty and the Hakka-led Taiping Heavenly Kingdom. It lasted from 1850 to 1864, although following the fall of Tianjing               (now Nanjing), the last rebel army was not wiped out until August 1871. After the conflict that caused around 20 million dead, the established Qing government won decisively, although at a great price to its fiscal and political structure.

The uprising was commanded by Hong Xiuquan, an ethnic Hakka (a Han subgroup) and the self-proclaimed brother of Jesus Christ. Its goals were religious, nationalist, and political in nature; Hong sought the conversion of the Han people to the Taiping's syncretic version of Christianity, to overthrow the Qing dynasty, and a state transformation. Rather than supplanting the ruling class, the Taipings sought to upend the moral and social order of China. The Taipings established the Heavenly Kingdom as an oppositional state based in Tianjing and gained control of a significant part of southern China, eventually expanding to command a population base of nearly 30 million people.

For more than a decade, Taiping armies occupied and fought across much of the mid and lower Yangtze valley, ultimately devolving into total civil war. It was the largest war in China since the Ming–Qing transition, involving most of Central and Southern China. It ranks as one of the bloodiest wars in human history, the bloodiest civil war, and the largest conflict of the 19th century. In terms of deaths, the civil war is comparable to World War I. 30 million people fled the conquered regions to foreign settlements or other parts of China. The war was characterized by extreme brutality on both sides. Taiping soldiers carried out widespread massacres of Manchus, the ethnic minority of the ruling Imperial House of Aisin-Gioro. Meanwhile, the Qing government also engaged in massacres, most notably against the civilian population of the Taiping capital, Tianjing.

Weakened severely by internal conflict, an attempted coup, and the failure of the siege of Beijing, the Taipings were defeated by decentralized, provincial armies such as the Xiang Army organized and commanded by Zeng Guofan. After moving down the Yangtze River and recapturing the strategic city of Anqing, Zeng's forces besieged Nanjing during May, 1862. After two more years, on June 1, 1864, Hong Xiuquan died and Nanking fell barely a month later. The 14-year civil war combined with other internal and external wars weakened the dynasty but provided incentive for an initially successful period of reform and self-strengthening. It exacerbated ethnic disputes and accelerated the rise of provincial power. Historians debate whether these developments foreshadowed the Warlord Era, the loss of central control after the establishment of Republic of China in 1912.

Names

The terms which writers use for the conflict and its participants often represent their different opinions. During the 19th century, the Qing did not describe the conflict as either a civil war or a movement because doing so would have lent credibility to the Taiping. Instead, they referred to the tumultuous civil war as a period of chaos, rebellion or military ascendancy. They often referred to it as the Hong-Yang Rebellion, referring to the two most prominent leaders. It was also dismissively referred to as the Red Sheep Rebellion because "Hong-Yang" sounds like "Red Sheep" in Chinese.

In modern China, the war is often referred to as the Taiping Heavenly Kingdom Movement, due to the fact that the Taiping espoused a doctrine which was both nationalist and communist, and the Taiping represented a popular ideology which was based on either Han nationalism or protocommunist values. The scholar Jian Youwen is among those who refer to the rebellion as the "Taiping Revolutionary Movement" on the grounds that it worked towards a complete change in the political and social system, rather than working towards the replacement of one dynasty with another.

Many Western historians refer to the conflict in general as the "Taiping Rebellion". Recently, however, scholars such as Tobie Meyer-Fong and Stephen Platt have argued that the term "Taiping Rebellion" is biased because it insinuates that the Qing government was a legitimate government which was fighting against the illegitimate Taiping rebels. Instead, they argue that the conflict should be called a "civil war". Other historians such as Jürgen Osterhammel term the conflict "Taiping Revolution" because of the rebels' radical transformational objectives and the social revolution that they initiated.

Little is known about how the Taiping referred to the war, but the Taiping often referred to the Qing in general and the Manchus in particular as some variant of demons or monsters, representing Hong's proclamation that they were fighting a holy war to rid the world of demons and establish paradise on earth. The Qing referred to the Taiping as Yue Bandits ( or ) in official sources, a reference to their origins in the southeastern province of Guangdong.

More colloquially, the Chinese called the Taiping some variant of Long-Hairs, because they did not shave their foreheads and braid their hair into a queue as Qing subjects were obligated to do, allowing their hair to grow long. In the 19th century, Western observers, depending on their ideology, referred to the Taiping as the "revolutionaries", "insurgents" or "rebels". In English, the Heavenly Kingdom of Peace has often been shortened to simply the Taipings, from the word "Peace" in the Heavenly Kingdom of Peace, but it was never a term that either the Taipings or their enemies used to refer to them.

History

Origins

During the 19th century, the Qing dynasty experienced a series of famines, natural disasters, economic problems and defeats at the hands of foreign powers. Farmers were heavily overtaxed, rents rose dramatically, and peasants started to desert their lands in droves. The Qing military had recently suffered a disastrous defeat in the First Opium War, while the Chinese economy was severely impacted by a trade imbalance caused by the large-scale and illicit importation of opium. Banditry became common, and numerous secret societies and self-defense units formed, all of which led to an increase in small-scale warfare.

Meanwhile, the population of China had increased rapidly, nearly doubling between 1766 and 1833, while the amount of cultivated land was stable. The government, commanded by ethnic Manchus, had become increasingly corrupt. It was weak in the southern regions where local clans dominated. Anti-Manchu sentiments were strongest in southern China among the Hakka community, a Han Chinese subgroup. Meanwhile, Christian missionaries were active.

In 1837, Hong Huoxiu, a Hakka from a poor village in Guangdong, failed the imperial examination for the third time, frustrating his ambition to become a scholar-official in the civil service and leading him to a nervous breakdown. While convalescing, Hong dreamed of visiting Heaven, where he discovered that he possessed a celestial family distinct from his earthly family. His heavenly father lamented that men were worshiping demons rather than himself and informed Hong that his given name violated taboos and had to be changed, suggesting as one option the "Hong Xiuquan" moniker ultimately adopted by Hong. In later embellishments, Hong would declare that he also saw Confucius being punished by his celestial father for leading the people astray. In 1843, Hong failed the imperial examinations for the fourth and final time. It was only then, prompted by a visit by his cousin, that Hong took time to carefully examine Christian pamphlets he had received from a Protestant Christian missionary several years earlier. After reading these pamphlets, Hong came to believe that they had given him the key to interpreting his visions: his celestial father was God the Father (whom he identified with Shangdi from Chinese tradition), the elder brother that he had also seen was Jesus Christ, and he had been directed to rid the world of demons, including the corrupt Qing government and Confucian teachings. In 1847 Hong went to Guangzhou, where he studied the Bible with Issachar Jacox Roberts, an American Baptist missionary. Roberts refused to baptize him and later stated that Hong's followers were "bent on making their burlesque religious pretensions serve their political purpose".

Soon after Hong began preaching across Guangxi in 1844, his follower Feng Yunshan founded the God Worshipping Society, a movement which followed Hong's fusion of Christianity, Daoism, Confucianism and indigenous millenarianism, which Hong presented as a restoration of the ancient Chinese faith in Shangdi. The Taiping faith, says one historian, "developed into a dynamic new Chinese religion ... Taiping Christianity".

The movement at first grew by suppressing groups of bandits and pirates in southern China in the late 1840s, then suppression by Qing authorities led it to evolve into guerrilla warfare and subsequently a widespread civil war. Eventually, two other God Worshippers claimed to possess the ability to speak as members of the "Celestial Family", the Father in the case of Yang Xiuqing and Jesus Christ in the case of Xiao Chaogui.

Early years
The Taiping Rebellion began in the southern province of Guangxi when local officials launched a campaign of religious persecution against the God Worshipping Society. In early January 1851, following a small-scale battle in late December 1850, a 10,000-strong rebel army organized by Feng Yunshan and Wei Changhui routed Qing forces stationed in Jintian (present-day Guiping, Guangxi). Taiping forces successfully repulsed an attempted imperial reprisal by the Green Standard Army against the Jintian uprising.

On January 11, 1851, Hong declared himself the Heavenly King of the Heavenly Kingdom of Peace (or Taiping Heavenly Kingdom), from which comes the term "Taipings" commonly used for them in English language studies. The Taipings began marching north in September 1851 to escape Qing forces closing in on them. The Taiping army pressed north into Hunan following the Xiang River, besieging Changsha, occupying Yuezhou, and then capturing Wuchang in December 1852 after reaching the Yangtze River. At this point the Taiping leadership decided to move east along the Yangtze River. Anqing was captured in February 1853.

Taiping leaders may have reached out to Triad organizations, which had many cells in South China and among government troops. Taiping titles echoed Triad usage, whether consciously or not, which made it more attractive for Triads to join the movement. In 1852, Qing government troops captured Hong Daquan, a rebel who had assumed the title Tian De Wang (King of Heavenly Virtue). Hong Daquan's confession claimed that Hong Xiuquan had made him co-sovereign of the Heavenly Kingdom and given him that title, but was more likely an echo of an earlier but unconnected White Lotus Rebellion. However, the capture of Nanjing in that year led to a deterioration of relations between the Taiping rebels and the triads.

Middle years

On March 19, 1853, the Taipings captured the city of Nanjing and Hong declared it the Heavenly Capital of his kingdom. Since the Taipings considered the Manchus to be demons, they first killed all the Manchu men, then forced the Manchu women outside the city and burned them to death. Shortly thereafter, the Taiping launched concurrent Northern and Western expeditions, in an effort to relieve pressure on Nanjing and achieve significant territorial gains. The former expedition was a complete failure but the latter achieved limited success.

In 1853, Hong Xiuquan withdrew from active control of policies and administration to rule exclusively by written proclamations. He lived in luxury and had many women in his inner chamber, and often issued religious strictures. He clashed with Yang Xiuqing, who challenged his often impractical policies, and became suspicious of Yang's ambitions, his extensive network of spies and his claims of authority when "speaking as God". This tension culminated in the 1856 Tianjing Incident, wherein Yang and his followers were slaughtered by Wei Changhui, Qin Rigang, and their troops on Hong Xiuquan's orders.

Shi Dakai's objection to the bloodshed led to his family and retinue being killed by Wei and Qin with Wei ultimately planning to imprison Hong. Wei's plans were ultimately thwarted and he and Qin were executed by Hong. Shi Dakai was given control of five Taiping armies, which were consolidated into one. But fearing for his life, he departed from Tianjing and headed west towards Sichuan.

With Hong withdrawn from view and Yang out of the picture, the remaining Taiping leaders tried to widen their popular support and forge alliances with European powers, but failed on both counts. The Europeans decided to stay officially neutral, though European military advisors served with the Qing army.

Inside China, the rebellion faced resistance from the traditionalist rural classes because of hostility to Chinese customs and Confucian values. The landowning upper class, unsettled by the Taiping ideology and the policy of strict separation of the sexes, even for married couples, sided with government forces.

In Hunan, a local irregular army called the Xiang Army or Hunan Army, under the personal leadership of Zeng Guofan, became the main armed force fighting for the Qing against the Taiping. Zeng's Xiang Army proved effective in gradually turning back the Taiping advance in the western theater of the war and ultimately retaking much of Hubei and Jiangxi provinces. In December 1856 Qing forces retook Wuchang for the final time. The Xiang Army captured Jiujiang in May 1858 and then the rest of Jiangxi province by September.

In 1859, Hong Rengan, Hong Xiuquan's cousin, joined the Taiping forces in Nanjing and was given considerable power by Hong. Hong Rengan developed an ambitious plan to expand the Taiping Heavenly Kingdom's boundaries.

In May 1860, the Taiping defeated the imperial forces that had been besieging Nanjing since 1853, eliminating them from the region and opening the way for a successful invasion of southern Jiangsu and Zhejiang provinces, the wealthiest region of the Qing Empire. The Taiping rebels were successful in taking Hangzhou on March 19, 1860, Changzhou on May 26, and Suzhou on June 2 to the east. While Taiping forces were preoccupied in Jiangsu, Zeng's forces moved down the Yangtze River.

Fall of the Taiping Heavenly Kingdom

An attempt to take Shanghai in August 1860 was repulsed by an army of Qing troops supported by European officers under the command of Frederick Townsend Ward. This army would become known as the "Ever Victorious Army", a seasoned and well trained Qing military force commanded by Charles George Gordon, and would be instrumental in the defeat of the Taiping rebels.

In 1861, around the time of the death of the Xianfeng Emperor and ascension of the Tongzhi Emperor, Zeng Guofan's Xiang Army captured Anqing with help from a naval blockade imposed by the Royal Navy on the city. Near the end of 1861 the Taipings launched a final Eastern Expedition. Ningbo was easily captured on December 9, and Hangzhou was besieged and finally captured on December 31, 1861. Taiping troops surrounded Shanghai in January 1862, but were unable to capture it.

The Ever-Victorious Army repulsed another attack on Shanghai in 1862 and helped to defend other treaty ports such as Ningbo, reclaimed on May 10. They also aided imperial troops in reconquering Taiping strongholds along the Yangtze River.

In 1863, Shi Dakai surrendered to the Qing near the Sichuan capital Chengdu and was executed by slow-slicing. Some of his followers escaped or were released and continued the fight against the Qing.

Qing forces were reorganised under the command of Zeng Guofan, Zuo Zongtang and Li Hongzhang, and the Qing reconquest began in earnest. Zeng Guofan had initially failed so badly that he attempted suicide, but he then adopted the teachings of the 16th century Ming-dynasty general Qi Jiguang. He bypassed the professional regular armies and recruited from local villages, paying and drilling them well. Zeng, Zuo, and Li led  personally loyal soldiers  By early 1864, Qing control in most areas had been reestablished.

In May 1862, the Xiang Army began directly besieging Nanjing and managed to hold firm despite numerous attempts by the numerically superior Taiping Army to dislodge them. Hong Xiuquan declared that God would defend Nanjing, but in June 1864, with Qing forces approaching, he died of food poisoning as a consequence of eating wild vegetables when the city ran low on food supplies. He was sick for 20 days before succumbing and a few days after his death, Qing forces took the city. Although Hong likely died of his illness, suicide by poison has also been suggested. His body was buried in the former Ming Imperial Palace, and was later exhumed on orders of Zeng Guofan to verify his death, and then cremated. Hong's ashes were later blasted out of a cannon in order to ensure that his remains had no resting place as eternal punishment for the uprising.

Four months before the fall of the Taiping Heavenly Kingdom, Hong Xiuquan abdicated in favor of his eldest son, Hong Tianguifu, who was 15 years old. The younger Hong was inexperienced and powerless, so the kingdom was quickly destroyed when Nanjing fell in July 1864 to the imperial armies after protracted street-by-street fighting. Tianguifu and few others escaped but were soon caught and executed. Most of the Taiping princes were executed.

A small remainder of loyal Taiping forces had continued to fight in northern Zhejiang, rallying around Tianguifu. But after Tianguifu's capture on October 25, 1864, Taiping resistance was gradually pushed into the highlands of Jiangxi, Zhejiang, Fujian and finally Guangdong, where one of the last Taiping loyalists, Wang Haiyang, was defeated on January 29, 1866.

Aftermath

Although the fall of Nanjing in 1864 marked the destruction of the Taiping regime, the fight was not yet over. There were still several hundred thousand Taiping troops continuing the fight, with more than a quarter-million fighting in the border regions of Jiangxi and Fujian alone. It was not until August 1871 that the last Taiping army led by Shi Dakai's commander, Li Fuzhong, was completely wiped out by government forces in the border region of Hunan, Guizhou and Guangxi.

Taiping wars also spilled over into Vietnam with devastating effects. In 1860, Wu Lingyun, an ethnic Zhuang Taiping leader, proclaimed himself King of Dingling in the Sino-Vietnamese border regions. Dingling was destroyed during a Qing campaign in 1868. His son Wu Yazhong, also called Wu Kun, fled to Vietnam but was killed in 1869 in Bắc Ninh by a Qing-Vietnamese coalition.

Wu Kun's troops broke up and became marauding armies such as the Yellow Flag Army led by Huang Chongying and the Black Flag Army led by Liu Yongfu. The latter would become a prominent warlord in Upper Tonkin and would later help the Nguyễn dynasty to engage against the French during the Sino-French War in the 1880s. He later became the second and last leader of the short-lived Republic of Formosa (5 June–21 October 1895).

Other "Flag Gangs" armed with the latest weapons, disintegrated into bandit groups that plundered remnants of the Lan Xang kingdom. They were then engaged in combat against the incompetent forces of King Rama V (r. 1868–1910) until 1890, when the last of the groups eventually disbanded. Their victims did not know where the bandits had come from and, when they plundered Buddhist temples, they were mistaken for Chinese Muslims from Yunnan called Hui in Mandarin and Haw in the Lao language (.) This resulted in the protracted series of conflicts being misnamed the Haw wars.

Death toll
With no reliable census at the time, estimates of the death toll of the Taiping Rebellion are speculative. The most widely cited sources estimate the total number of deaths during the almost 14 years of the rebellion to be approximately 20–30 million civilians and soldiers. Most of the deaths were attributed to plague and famine. Some analysts have claimed that the death toll may have reached 100 million.

Concurrent rebellions

The Nian Rebellion (1853–1868), and several Chinese Muslim rebellions in the southwest (the Panthay Rebellion, 1855–1873) and the northwest (Dungan revolt, 1862–1877) continued to pose considerable problems for the Qing dynasty.

Occasionally, the Nian rebels collaborated with Taiping forces, for instance, they collaborated during the Northern Expedition. As the Taiping rebellion lost ground, particularly after the fall of Nanjing in 1864, former Taiping soldiers and commanders like Lai Wenguang were incorporated into Nian ranks.

After the failure of the Red Turban Rebellion (1854–1856) to capture Guangzhou, their soldiers retreated north into Jiangxi and joined forces with Shi Dakai. After the defeat of the Li Yonghe and Lan Chaoding rebellion in Sichuan, remnants combined with Taiping forces in Shaanxi. Remnant forces of the Small Swords Society uprising in Shanghai regrouped with the Taiping army.

Du Wenxiu, who led the Panthay Rebellion in Yunnan, was in contact with the Taiping Heavenly Kingdom. He was not waging his rebellion against Han Chinese, instead, he was anti-Qing and he wanted to destroy the Qing government. Du's forces led many non-Muslim forces, including Han Chinese, Li, Bai, and Hani peoples. They were assisted by non-Muslim Shan and Kakhyen and other hill tribes in the revolt.

The other Muslim rebellion, the Dungan revolt, was the reverse: it was not aiming to overthrow the Qing dynasty because its leader Ma Hualong had accepted an imperial title. Instead, it erupted as a result of intersectional fighting between Muslim factions and Han Chinese. During the Dungan revolt, various groups fought against each other without any coherent goal. According to modern researchers, the Dungan rebellion began in 1862, not as a planned uprising but as a coalescence of many local brawls and riots which were triggered by trivial causes, among these causes were false rumors that the Hui Muslims were aiding the Taiping rebels. The Hui Ma Xiaoshi claimed that the Shaanxi Muslim rebellion was connected to the Taiping. Jonathan Spence claimed that a key reason for the Taiping's defeat was its inability to coordinate its rebellion with other rebellions.

Taiping Heavenly Kingdom's policies

The rebels announced social reforms, including strict separation of the sexes, abolition of foot binding, land socialisation, and "suppression" of private trade. They also outlawed the importation of opium into all Taiping territories. In regards to religion, the Kingdom established as official religion Hong's Shenism, which held that Hong Xiuquan was the younger brother of Jesus and second son of the Emperor. Because Hong saw Confucianism was a shadow of its noble origin, being now a tool of the Qing to tyrannize Han people, libraries of the Confucian monasteries were destroyed (almost completely in the case of the Yangtze Delta area), and the temples were often defaced or turned into temples of his new religion or hospitals and libraries.

Traditionalist works like those of Confucius were burned and their sellers executed. The Taiping were especially opposed to idolatry, destroying idols wherever found with great prejudice. Though the destruction of idols was initially welcomed by foreign missionaries, missionaries eventually came to fear the zealotry of the Taiping that they had a hand in creating.

Separation of the sexes was strictly enforced in the first few years, although it tapered off in later years. Part of the extremeness came from a mistranslation of the Ten Commandments, which led to the seventh commandment also forbidding "licentiousness" as well as adultery. It was so severe that parents and children of the opposite sex could not interact, and even married couples were discouraged from having sex.

Military

Taiping forces

The rebels used brilliant unorthodox strategies that nearly toppled the dynasty but inspired it to adopt what one historian calls "the most significant military experimentation since the seventeenth century." The Taiping army was the rebellion's key strength. It was marked by a high level of discipline and fanaticism. They typically wore a uniform of red jackets with blue trousers, and grew their hair long so in China they were nicknamed "long hair". In the beginning of the rebellion, the large numbers of women serving in the Taiping army also distinguished it from other 19th-century armies. However, after 1853 there ceased being many women in the Taiping army. Hong Xuanjiao, Su Sanniang and Qiu Ersao are examples of women who became leaders of the Taiping army's female soldiers.

Combat was always bloody and extremely brutal, with little artillery but huge forces equipped with small arms. Both armies would attempt to push each other off of the battlefield, and though casualties were high, few battles were decisively won. The Taiping army's main strategy of conquest was to take major cities, consolidate their hold on the cities, then march out into the surrounding countryside to recruit local farmers and battle government forces.

Estimates of the overall size of the Taiping army are around 2,000,000 soldiers. The army's organization was allegedly inspired by that of the Qin dynasty. Each army corps consisted of roughly 13,000 men. These corps were placed into armies of varying sizes. In addition to the main Taiping forces organised along the above lines, there were also thousands of pro-Taiping groups fielding their own forces of irregulars.

The rebels were relatively well-equipped with modern weapons. They were not supported by foreign governments, but they bought modern munitions – including firearms, artillery, and ammunition – from foreign suppliers. The rebels were buying weapons by 1853. Munitions – partially sourced from Western manufacturers and military stores – were smuggled into China, mainly by English and Americans. An April 1862 shipment from an American dealer "well known for their dealings with rebels" included 2,783 (percussion cap) muskets, 66 carbines, 4 rifles, and 895 field artillery guns; the dealer carried passports signed by the Loyal King.

The rebels also manufactured weapons, and imported manufacturing equipment. In the summer of 1862, a Western observer noted that rebel factories in Nanjing were producing superior guns – including heavy cannon – than the Qing. The rebels augmented their modern arsenal with captured equipment. Just before his execution, Taiping Loyal King Li Xiucheng advised the Qing to buy, and to learn how to replicate, the best foreign cannon and gun carriages to prepare for war with foreign powers.

As early as 1853, foreigners from various countries joined the rebels in combat and administrative roles, and were in a position to observe the Taiping in battle. The rebels were courageous under fire, erected defensive works quickly, and used mobile pontoon bridges. One tactic was to ring a Qing emplacement in fire and kill the fleeing Qing troops as they emerged individually.

There was also a small Taiping Navy, composed of captured boats, that operated along the Yangtze and its tributaries. Among the Navy's commanders was the Hang King Tang Zhengcai.

Ethnic structure of the Taiping army

Ethnically, the Taiping army was at the outset formed largely from these groups: the Hakka, a Han Chinese subgroup; the Cantonese, local residents of Guangdong province; and the Zhuang (a non-Han ethnic group). It is no coincidence that Hong Xiuquan and the other Taiping royals were Hakka.

As a Han subgroup, the Hakka were frequently marginalised economically and politically, having migrated to the regions which their descendants presently inhabit only after other Han groups were already established there. For example, when the Hakka settled in Guangdong and parts of Guangxi, speakers of Yue Chinese (Cantonese) were already the dominant regional Han group there and they had been so for some time, just as speakers of various dialects of Min are locally dominant in Fujian province.

The Hakka settled throughout southern China and beyond, but as latecomers they generally had to establish their communities on rugged, less fertile land scattered on the fringes of the local majority group's settlements. As their name ("guest households") suggests, the Hakka were generally treated as migrant newcomers, and often subjected to hostility and derision from the local majority Han populations. Consequently, the Hakka, to a greater extent than other Han Chinese, have been historically associated with popular unrest and rebellion.

The other significant ethnic group in the Taiping army was the Zhuang, an indigenous people of Tai origin and China's largest non-Han ethnic minority group. Over the centuries, Zhuang communities had been adopting Han Chinese culture. This was possible because Han culture in the region accommodates a great deal of linguistic diversity, so the Zhuang could be absorbed as if the Zhuang language were just another Han Chinese dialect (which it is not). Because Zhuang communities were integrating with the Han at different rates, a certain amount of friction between the Han and the Zhuang was inevitable, with Zhuang unrest leading to armed uprisings on occasion.

Social structure of the Taiping Army
Socially and economically, the Taiping rebels came almost exclusively from the lowest classes. Many of the southern Taiping troops were former miners, especially those coming from the Zhuang. Very few Taiping rebels, even in the leadership caste, came from the imperial bureaucracy. Almost none were landlords and in occupied territories landlords were often executed.

Qing forces

Opposing the rebellion was an imperial army with over a million regulars and unknown thousands of regional militias and foreign mercenaries operating in support. Among the imperial forces was the elite Ever Victorious Army, consisting of Chinese soldiers led by a Western officer corps (see Frederick Townsend Ward and Charles Gordon) and supplied by European arms companies like Willoughbe & Ponsonby.

A particularly famous imperial force was Zeng Guofan's Xiang Army. Zuo Zongtang from Hunan province was another important Qing general who contributed in suppressing the Taiping Rebellion. Where the armies under the control of dynasty itself were unable to defeat the Taiping, these gentry-led Yong Ying armies were able to succeed.

Although keeping accurate records was something imperial China traditionally did very well, the decentralized nature of the imperial war effort (relying on regional forces) and the fact that the war was a civil war and therefore very chaotic, meant that reliable figures are impossible to find. The destruction of the Taiping Heavenly Kingdom also meant that the majority of any records it possessed were destroyed, the percentage of records said to have survived is around 10%.

Over the course of the conflict, around 90% of recruits to the Taiping side would be killed or defect.

The organisation of the Qing Imperial Army was thus:
 Eight Banners Army: 250,000 soldiers
 Green Standard Army: ~610,000 soldiers
 Xiang (Hunan) Army: 130,000 soldiers
 Huai (Anhui) Army: 70,000 soldiers
 Chu Army: 40,000 soldiers
 Ever Victorious Army: 5,000 soldiers
 Village Militias: unknown thousands

Total war

The Taiping Rebellion was a total war. Almost every citizen who had not fled the Taiping Heavenly Kingdom was given military training and conscripted into the army to fight against Qing imperial forces. Under the Taiping household registration system, one adult male from each household was to be conscripted into the Army.

During this conflict, both sides tried to deprive each other of the resources which they needed in order to continue the war and it became standard practice for each to destroy the opposing side's agricultural areas, butcher the populations of cities and generally exact a brutal price from the inhabitants of captured enemy lands in order to drastically weaken the opposition's war effort. This war was total in the sense that civilians on both sides participated in the war effort to a significant extent and the armies on both sides waged war against both the civilian population and military forces. Contemporary accounts describe the amount of desolation which befell rural areas as a result of the conflict.

In every area which they captured, the Taiping immediately exterminated the entire Manchu population. In the province of Hunan one Qing loyalist who observed the genocidal massacres which the Taiping forces committed against the Manchus wrote that the "pitiful Manchus", the Manchu men, women and children were executed by the Taiping forces. The Taiping rebels were seen chanting while slaughtering the Manchus in Hefei. After capturing Nanjing, Taiping forces killed about 40,000 Manchu civilians. On 27 October 1853, they crossed the Yellow River in T'sang-chou and murdered 10,000 Manchus.

Since the rebellion began in Guangxi, Qing forces allowed no rebels speaking its dialect to surrender. Reportedly in the province of Guangdong, it is written that 1,000,000 were executed because after the collapse of the Taiping Heavenly Kingdom, the Qing dynasty launched waves of massacres against the Hakkas, that at their height killed up to 30,000 each day. These policies of mass murder of civilians occurred elsewhere in China, including Anhui, and Nanjing. This resulted in a massive civilian flight and death toll with some 600 towns destroyed and other bloody policies resulting.

Legacy
Beyond staggering human and economic devastation, the Taiping Rebellion left changes within the late Qing dynasty. Power was, to a limited extent, decentralized, and ethnic Han Chinese officials were more widely employed in high positions than they had previously been. The traditional Manchu banner forces upon which the Qing dynasty depended failed and were gradually replaced with gentry-organized local armies. Franz H. Michael, wrote that these armies evolved into  armies used by local warlords who dominated China after the fall of the Qing dynasty. Diana Lary, however, in a review-of-the-field article, cited studies that were skeptical of these claims, since the armies created to put down the Taiping operated in a different context from later regional armies.

The Taiping example of insurgent organization and its mix of Christianity and radical social equality influenced Sun Yat-sen and other future revolutionaries. Some Taiping veterans joined the Revive China Society, whose Christian members organized short-lived Heavenly Kingdom of the Great Mingshun in 1903. Although Karl Marx wrote several articles about the Taipings, he did not perceive a social program or agenda for change, only violence and destruction. The Chinese Communist historians, following the lead of Mao Zedong, however, characterised the rebellion as a proto-communist uprising. Both Communist and Chinese Nationalist commanders studied Taiping organization and strategy during the Chinese Civil War. American General Joseph Stilwell, who commanded Chinese troops during World War Two in China, praised Zeng Guofan's campaigns for combining "caution with daring' and "initiative with perseverance."

Famine, disease, massacres, and social disruption led to a sharp decline in population, especially in the Yangtze delta region. The result was a shortage in labor supply for the first time in centuries, making labor relatively more valuable than land. The Xiang Army used scorched earth tactics, refusing to take prisoners; Anhui, Southern Jiangsu, Northern Zhejiang and Northern Jiangxi were severely depopulated and had to be repopulated with migrants from Henan. The landed gentry of the Lower Yangtze region were reduced in numbers and concentration of land ownership was reduced.

The defeat of the Taiping Rebellion by military forces from Hunan led to the dramatic increase of Hunanese representation in the government, who played a role in reform efforts. By 1865, five of the eight viceroys were Hunanese. The Hunanese gentry, based on their experience with the Taiping, were more guarded against the influence of Westerners than other provinces.

Merchants in Shanxi and the Huizhou region of Anhui became less prominent because the rebellion disrupted trade in much of the country. However, trade in coastal regions, especially in Guangzhou (Canton) and Ningbo was less affected by violence than trade in inland areas was. Streams of refugees who entered Shanghai contributed to the economic development of the city, which was previously less commercially relevant than other cities in the area were. Only a tenth of Taiping-published records survive to this day because they were mostly destroyed by the Qing in an attempt to rewrite the history of the conflict.

Historian John King Fairbank compares the Taiping rebels with the communists under Mao Zedong who came to power a century later:

In popular culture
The Taiping Rebellion has been treated in historical novels. Robert Elegant's 1983 Mandarin depicts the time from the point of view of a Jewish family living in Shanghai. In Flashman and the Dragon, the fictional Harry Paget Flashman recounts his adventures during the Second Opium War and the Taiping Rebellion. In Lisa See's novel Snow Flower and the Secret Fan the title character is married to a man who lives in Jintian and the characters get caught up in the action.

Amy Tan's The Hundred Secret Senses takes place in part during the time of the Taiping Rebellion. Rebels of the Heavenly Kingdom by Katherine Paterson is a young adult novel set during the Taiping Rebellion. Li Bo's Tienkuo: The Heavenly Kingdom takes place within the Taiping capital at Nanjing.

The war has also been depicted in a few television shows and films. In 1988 Hong Kong's TVB produced Twilight of a Nation, a 45-episode drama about the Taiping Rebellion. In 2000 CCTV produced The Taiping Heavenly Kingdom, a 46-episode series about the Taiping Rebellion.  The Warlords is a 2007 historical film set in the 1860s showing Gen. Pang Qinyun, leader of the Shan Regiment, as responsible for the capture of Suzhou and Nanjing.

Relationship with the Western powers 
The Taiping government maintained an ambivalent relationship with the Western powers who were active in China during this period. Due to the religious aspects of the rebellion, the Taiping government perceived Westerners as "brothers and sisters from overseas". The Taiping government proved especially welcoming to Western missionaries. In 1853, Hong Xiuquan invited American missionary Issachar Jacox Roberts to come to Nanking to aid in the administration of his government. After Roberts arrived in Nanking in 1861 and met with Hong, he was commissioned by him as the director of foreign affairs.

While some missionaries like Roberts were enthusiastic in the first few years about the Taiping rebellion, Western skepticism existed from the inception of the rebellion. According to historian Prescott Clarke, Westerners in China became separated into two different groups in regards to their views on the rebellion, with one side depicting the rebels as mere robbers whose intention was to gather wealth through revolting against the Qing, and the other side depicting the rebel army as religious fanatics provoked by skillful leaders to fight against the Qing to the death.

The government officials of the Western powers were optimistic about the Taiping government's chance of victory in the early stages. According to historian Eugene P. Boardman, the Qing dynasty's enforcement of the treaty of 1842–1844 was frustrating US and British officials, especially in terms of open trade. According to Boardman the Christian nature of the Taiping opened up the possibility for a more cooperative trade partnership. Many Western officials visited the capital of Taiping between 1863 and 1864, and American commissioner Robert Milligan McLane considered granting official recognition of the Taiping government.

According to Clarke the Western missionaries changed their opinions upon further inspections of the rebellion. That change was captured in a letter from the American missionary Divie Bethune McCartee. Upon visiting Nanking, McCartee described the situation in the city as "Dreadful destruction of life." As for the actual practice of Christianity in the city, McCartee said "I saw no signs of anything resembling Christianity in or near Nanking". Similarly to McCartee, Hong's director of foreign affairs I. J. Roberts wrote, "His religious toleration, and multiplicity of chapels turns out to be a farce, of no avail in the spread of Christianity – worse than useless."

After the conclusion of the Second Opium War, Royal Navy officer Sir James Hope led an expedition to Nanking in February 1861. This expedition was the largest party of Westerners to visit Taiping territories, with the inclusion of many British military personnel, entrepreneurs, missionaries, other unofficial observers and two French representatives. Upon visiting the capital, some members of the expedition wrote that "devastation marked our journey" in reference to the conditions in Taiping territories. Some reports suggested a great deal of indiscriminate slaughter of civilians conducted by the Taiping army in newly controlled areas.

In late 1861, Hope made a brief visit to Nanking to come to an agreement with the Taiping rebels not to attack the city of Shanghai, a proposal which was refused by the Taiping government. According to Clarke, this refusal of cooperation and Taiping's occupation of Ningbo in December led to the limited intervention against the rebellion by the British and French in the following years. Western assistance for the Qing was also driven by the fear that a successful rebellion would lead to a stronger China able to resist Western power.

See also

 Boxer Rebellion
 Christianity in China
 List of revolutions and rebellions
 List of wars and anthropogenic disasters by death toll
 Miao Rebellion (1854–1873)
 Nian Rebellion
 Punti-Hakka Clan Wars
 Millenarianism in colonial societies

Notes

Citations

Sources

Modern monographs and surveys
 
  Emphasis on the military history.
  Translated and condensed from the author's publications in Chinese; especially strong on the military campaigns, based on the author's wide travels in China in the 1920s and 1930s.
 
  A study of the victims, their experience of the war, and the memorialization of the war.
 
  Detailed narrative analysis.
  Focuses on the religious basis of the rebellion.
 
 
  Standard textbook.

Scholarly articles

Primary sources
 . 3 vols. Volumes two and three select and translate basic documents.

Further reading

Modern monographs and surveys
 
 Caleb Carr, The Devil Soldier: The Story of Frederick Townsend Ward (1994) .
 Carl J. Danko, Foreign Devils and God-Worshipers: Western Mercenaries and Cross-Cultural Realism During the Taiping Rebellion (Army Command And General Staff College, 2017) online
 John King Fairbank, et al. East Asia: The modern transformation (1965) 2:155–178. online
 Jack Gray, Rebellions and Revolutions: China from the 1800s to the 1980s (1990), 
 Immanuel C. Y. Hsu, The Rise of Modern China (1999), . Standard textbook; online
 Philip A. Kuhn, Rebellion and Its Enemies in Late Imperial China; Militarization and Social Structure, 1796–1864 (Cambridge, MA Harvard University Press, 1970). Influential analysis of the rise of rebellion and the organization of its suppression. online
 Philip A. Kuhn, "The Taiping Rebellion," in John K. Fairbank, ed., Cambridge History of China Vol Ten Pt One (Cambridge: Cambridge Univ Press, 1970): 264–317.
 Rudolf G. Wagner. Reenacting the Heavenly Vision: The Role of Religion in the Taiping Rebellion. (Berkeley: Institute of East Asian Studies, University of California, Berkeley, China Research Monograph 25, 1982). .
 Mary Clabaugh Wright. The Last Stand of Chinese Conservatism: The T'ung-Chih Restoration, 1862–1874. Stanford: Stanford University Press, 1957; rpr. 1974 . Account of the Han Chinese/ Manchu coalition which revived the dynasty and defeated the Taipings.

Scholarly articles
 
 
 
 
  (hardcover),  (paperback).

Fiction
 
 Hosea Ballou Morse, In the Days of the Taipings, Being the Recollections of Ting Kienchang, Otherwise Meisun, Sometime Scoutmaster and Captain in the Ever-Victorious Army and Interpreter-in-Chief to General Ward and General Gordon (Salem, MA: The Essex institute, 1927; Reprinted: San Francisco: Chinese Materials Center, 1974).
 George MacDonald Fraser. Flashman and the Dragon. New York: Knopf, 1986. . A volume in The Flashman Papers series.

Contemporaneous accounts
 
 
 Thomas Taylor Meadows, The Chinese and Their Rebellions, Viewed in Connection with Their National Philosophy, Ethics, Legislation, and Administration. To Which Is Added, an Essay on Civilization and Its Present State in the East and West. (London: Smith, Elder; Bombay: Smith, Taylor, 1856). American Libraries eBook text
 Brine, Lindesay, The Taeping rebellion in China (London: J. Murray, 1862)
 Ven. Archdeacon Moule, Personal Recollections of the T'ai-p'ing Rebellion 1861–63 (Shanghai: Printed at the "Celestial Empire" Office 1884).

External links

 Taiping Rebellion Videos – Chronological presentation of the Taiping Rebellion, with details and anecdotes. Archived at ghostarchive.org on May 24, 2022.
 Taiping Rebellion.com – Narrative history, with many illustrations, a Timeline, and a detailed Map of the Rebellion.
 The Taiping Rebellion – BBC discussion with Rana Mitter, University of Oxford; Frances Wood British Library; and Julia Lovell, University of London.

 
1850 in China
1851 in China
1852 in China
1853 in China
1854 in China
1855 in China
1856 in China
1857 in China
1858 in China
1859 in China
1860 in China
1861 in China
1862 in China
1863 in China
1864 in China
19th century in China
19th-century rebellions
Taiping Heavenly Kingdom
Peasant revolts
Persecution of Buddhists
Rebellions in the Qing dynasty
Religion-based civil wars
Wars involving France
Wars involving the Qing dynasty
Wars involving the United Kingdom
Christianity in China
Christianization
Eight Banners
Genocides in Asia